Hao Peng may refer to:

Hao Peng (ROC), Republic of China politician of the Wang Jingwei regime
Hao Peng (PRC), People's Republic of China politician, Communist Party Secretary of Liaoning
Hao Peng (footballer) (born 2001), Chinese footballer for Shanghai Port

See also
Hao Ping, Chinese historian and academic administrator